Epitelidas of Laconia was an ancient Greek athlete listed by Eusebius of Caesarea as a victor in the stadion race of the 50th Olympiad (580 BC). His victory marked the 20th Spartan triumph in the category during a period of 140 years.

See also 
 Olympic winners of the Stadion race

References 

6th-century BC Greek people
Ancient Olympic competitors
Ancient Greek runners
Ancient Spartan athletes